Aleksei Alekseievich Rodionov (March 27, 1922 – May 18, 2013) was a Soviet-Ukrainian diplomat who served as the Soviet Ambassador to Pakistan from 1971 until 1974 and the Ambassador of Ukraine to Canada after the Cold war from 1991 to 1992.

He is notable for his appointment that saw his involvement during the war with India in 1971 when the Soviet Union directed a secret message to President Yahya Khan to come up with a peaceful political settlement for the East Pakistan to avoid going through the conflict with India. The now-declassified Rodionov message ultimately warned Pakistan that "it will [be] embarking [on] a suicidal course if it escalates tensions in the subcontinent."

Rodionov reportedly had an acrimonious meeting with President Yahya Khan a week after the Indo-Soviet treaty was signed. During his tenure, the Soviet Union's relations with Yahya Khan had met with demise but he worked towards repairing relations with Bhutto in 1971 when he lobbied in the Soviet Union for the establishment of the Pakistan Steel Mills. On 24 January 1972, he delivered an official invitation to then-President Zulfikar Ali Bhutto In Karachi to pay a state visit to Soviet Union that took place in 1974. In 1974, Rodionov was recalled from his posting as Soviet ambassador to Pakistan in order to take up other duties. Soviet Ambassador Sarvar A. Azimov had succeeded him who stayed until 1980.

After the Cold War, he opted for Ukraine and served as  Ambassador of Ukraine to Canada from 1991 until 1992.

See also 
 Indo-Pakistani War of 1971
 Timeline of the Bangladesh Liberation War
 Military plans of the Bangladesh Liberation War
 Mitro Bahini order of battle
 Pakistan Army order of battle, December 1971
 Evolution of Pakistan Eastern Command plan
 1971 Bangladesh genocide
 Operation Searchlight
 Indo-Pakistani wars and conflicts
 Military history of India
 List of military disasters
 List of wars involving India

References

1922 births
2013 deaths
Ambassadors of the Soviet Union to Pakistan
People of the Indo-Pakistani War of 1971
Ambassadors of Ukraine to Canada
Ambassadors of the Soviet Union to Turkey
Ambassadors of the Soviet Union to Canada
Ambassadors of the Soviet Union to Myanmar